Carolyn Jeni Schuwalow (born 10 August 1965) is an Australian long-distance runner. She competed in the women's 10,000 metres at the 1988 Summer Olympics.

References

External links
 

1965 births
Living people
Athletes (track and field) at the 1988 Summer Olympics
Australian female long-distance runners
Olympic athletes of Australia
Place of birth missing (living people)
20th-century Australian women
21st-century Australian women